Libor Holík (born 12 May 1998) is a Czech professional footballer who plays as a defender for Viktoria Plzeň in the Czech First League.

Club career

He made his career league debut for SK Slavia Prague on 21 November 2015 in a Czech First League 2-0 away win at 1. FC Slovácko as a late substitute. He made his first appearance in the starting eleven on 14 July 2016 in a UEFA Europa League qualifying match against Levadia Tallinn.

References

External links 
 
 Libor Holík official international statistics
 

Czech footballers
1998 births
Living people
Czech First League players
SK Slavia Prague players
Association football defenders
MFK Karviná players
FC Fastav Zlín players
FC Vysočina Jihlava players
FK Jablonec players
Czech Republic youth international footballers
Czech Republic under-21 international footballers
FC Viktoria Plzeň players